Cyrturella is a genus of flies in the family Dolichopodidae. It is known from the Palearctic realm.

The genus was created by Octave Parent in 1938 for the species Micromorphus albosetosus, and was originally given the name Cyrtura. This name for the genus was already in use by the extinct stem-turtle genus Cyrtura, so Parent's genus was renamed to Cyrturella by James Edward Collin in 1952.

Species 
 Cyrturella albosetosa (Strobl, 1909) – Spain, England, Germany, Hungary, Portugal, ?France
 Cyrturella nigrosetosa Grichanov, 2016 – Egypt: Sinai Peninsula

Cyrturella orientalis Hollis, 1964 was moved to Paramedetera.

References 

Dolichopodidae genera
Medeterinae
Taxa named by James Edward Collin
Diptera of Europe
Diptera of Asia